Vriesea joyae is a plant species in the genus Vriesea. This species is endemic to Brazil.

References

joyae
Flora of Brazil